Joaquín López-Dóriga Velandia (born 8 February 1947) is a Spanish Mexican journalist. He started working as a journalist for the daily El Heraldo de México at the age of 18, and two years later he joined Jacobo Zabludovsky in the television news program 24 Horas. In 1988 he was appointed news director of the Instituto Mexicano de la Televisión (Imevisión).

He hosted the late evening news show El Noticiero con Joaquín López-Dóriga on Canal de las Estrellas. He also hosts the radio talk show López-Dóriga for Radio Fórmula Network, writes for Milenio Diario and co-hosts the talk show Tercer Grado, and is a member of the CNDH Consultant Council.

López-Dóriga is known for spinning his chair at the end of his program on Canal de las Estrellas.

References

External links 
 Biography

1947 births
Living people
People from Madrid
Mexican journalists
Male journalists
Mexican news anchors
Spanish emigrants to Mexico
Naturalized citizens of Mexico
Mexican people of Spanish descent